17α-Ethynyl-3β-androstanediol (developmental code HE-3539; also known as 17α-ethynyl-5α-androstane-3β,17β-diol) is a synthetic estrogen and a 17α-substituted derivative of 3β-androstanediol which was never marketed.

17α-Ethynyl-3β-androstanediol shows high affinity for the estrogen receptors in vitro ( values of 16 nM for ERα and 126 nM for ERβ relative to values of 8 nM at ERα and 7 nM at ERβ for estradiol), and activates the estrogen receptors in vitro ( value of 0.9 nM relative to 0.002 nM for estradiol). It also has weak affinity for the androgen receptor in vitro (IC50 = 277 nM relative to 15 nM for dihydrotestosterone), but doesn't appear to activate the receptor. 17α-Ethynyl-3β-androstanediol may produce 17α-ethynyl-3α-androstanediol and 5α-dihydroethisterone (5α-dihydro-17α-ethynyltestosterone) as active metabolites in vivo. In accordance with its in-vitro estrogenic activity, 17α-ethynyl-3β-androstanediol produces estrogenic effects like uterotrophy and testicular atrophy in animals.

Esters of 17α-ethynyl-3β-androstanediol have been developed and studied.

17α-Ethynyl-3β-androstanediol is a positional isomer of 17α-ethynyl-3α-androstanediol, and is a metabolite of this compound in vivo via metabolic inversion of the position of the C3 hydroxyl group. It may be involved in the biological activity of 17α-ethynyl-3α-androstanediol.

Analogues of 17α-ethynyl-3β-androstanediol include 17α-ethynyl-3α-androstanediol, ethinylandrostenediol (17α-ethynyl-5-androstenediol), ethandrostate (17α-ethynyl-5-androstenediol 3β-cyclohexanepropionate), ethinylestradiol (17α-ethynylestradiol), ethisterone (17α-ethynyltestosterone), and 5α-dihydroethisterone (17α-ethynyldihydrotestosterone).

References

5α-Reduced steroid metabolites
Abandoned drugs
Ethynyl compounds
Androstanes
Antigonadotropins
Diols
Human drug metabolites
Synthetic estrogens